2rude, also known as Richard Rude or Richard  Rudimental, is a Canadian hip hop and rhythm and blues record producer. He is perhaps most known as a producer of the songs "Thinkin' About You", a collaboration with Snow, rapper Smoothe tha Hustler and singers Miranda and Latoya Walsh, which won Juno Award for R&B/Soul Recording of the Year at the Juno Awards of 2000, and "Bout Your Love", a collaboration with Glenn Lewis which was nominated in the same category at the Juno Awards of 1999.

Both songs were featured on 2rude's album Rudimental 2K. The album also included the single "Dissin' Us", a collaboration with Grimmi Grimmi and Jully Black which won the MuchMusic Video Award for Best R&B/Soul Video in 2000… making it his 2nd consecutive win for Best R&B/Soul Video after the 1999 win with "Thinkin' About You", a collaboration with Snow, rapper Smoothe tha Hustler and singers Miranda and Latoya Walsh as well 

2rude has been an independent artist and producer on his label Rudimental Records Inc. The Walsh sisters, the daughters of Eric Walsh of the reggae band Messenjah, went on to join the reunited touring lineup of The Parachute Club.

References

Canadian hip hop record producers
Juno Award for R&B/Soul Recording of the Year winners
Black Canadian musicians
Musicians from Toronto
Living people
Year of birth missing (living people)